Anthony Davis (born September 6, 1970), better known by his stage name Ant, is an American hip hop producer. He is best known as being one half of the hip hop group Atmosphere, but has worked with many other artists and projects, mostly with Rhymesayers Entertainment, such as Brother Ali, I Self Devine, Felt and The Dynospectrum. He has also released two solo albums, Melodies and Memories, and Melodies and Memories 85–89.

Biography
Ant started to become interested in DJing at a very young age. He would watch his father DJ in the army while he would picture himself as Grandmaster Flash. Years later he would start to use producing and DJing as much more than a hobby. The first CD that he worked on was Comparison by Beyond, later known by Sab the Artist, in 1996. While producing that album, he met Sean Daley (Slug) and they later worked together. With one exception (Lucy Ford: The Atmosphere EPs), Ant has produced every Atmosphere album in full. He also works with various artists that are a part of Rhymesayers Entertainment (including full production of three Brother Ali albums) and many more.

Discography
Solo releases
 Melodies and Memories (2001)
 Melodies and Memories 85–89 (2005)

with Atmosphere (for more information, see Atmosphere Discography)
Overcast! EP (1997)
Overcast! (1997)
Lucy Ford: The Atmosphere EPs (2001)
God Loves Ugly (2002)
Seven's Travels (2003)
Headshots: SE7EN (2005)
You Can't Imagine How Much Fun We're Having (2005)
Happy Clown Bad Dub 8/Fun EP (2006)
3:16 Walk Like a Man (2005) Ant produces the track "Love is a Pimp"
Sad Clown Bad Summer 9 (2007)
Sad Clown Bad Fall 10 (2007)
Sad Clown Bad Winter 11 (2007)
Strictly Leakage (2007)
Sad Clown Bad Spring 12 (2008)
When Life Gives You Lemons, You Paint That Shit Gold (2008)
Leak at Will (2009)
To All My Friends, Blood Makes The Blade Holy: The Atmosphere EP's (2010)
The Family Sign (2011)
Southsiders (2014)
Fishing Blues (2016)
Mi Vida Local (2018)
Whenever (2019)
The Day Before Halloween (2020)
WORD? (2021)

production for Brother Ali
Shadows on the Sun (Rhymesayers Entertainment, 2003)
The Champion EP (Rhymesayers Entertainment, 2004)
The Undisputed Truth (Rhymesayers Entertainment, 2007)
Us (Rhymesayers Entertainment, 2009)
All The Beauty In This Whole Life (Rhymesayers Entertainment, 2017)
with Felt
Felt, Vol. 2: A Tribute to Lisa Bonet (Rhymesayers Entertainment, 2005)
Felt 4 U (Rhymesayers Entertainment, 2020)

Other production
Beyond – Comparison (Rhymesayers Entertainment, 1996)
Dynospectrum – Dynospectrum (Rhymesayers Entertainment, 1998)
Agape – Many Rooms (2000)
Kanser – Now (Self-released, 1997) Ant produces all tracks except "Open Your Eyes"
Kanser – Network (Self-released, 1998) Ant produces the track "612"
Kanser – Inner City Outer Space (Interlock Records, 2000) Ant produces the track "Girls Step To This"
Deep Puddle Dynamics – The Taste Of Rain... Why Kneel (anticon, 1999) Ant produces the track "The Scarecrow Speaks"
Musab – Respect The Life (Rhymesayers Entertainment, 2002) Ant produces the tracks "Posin'", "Cut Throat", "Extravagant", "In My World", "Powerite", "Make Believe", "Fools Paradise", and "Falling Apart"
Murs – The End Of The Beginning... (definitive jux, 2002) Ant produces the tracks "18/w A Bullet (Remix)" & "Got Damned"
The Planets – The Opening (Red Sea Records, 2002) Ant produces the track "Global"
MF Doom – Mm..LeftOvers (Rhymesayers Entertainment, 2004) Ant remixes the track "Hoe Cakes"
Sage Francis – Human the Death Dance (Epitaph Records, 2007) Ant produces the track "High Step"
Traditional Methods – Falling Forward (Interlock Records, 2004) Ant produces the track "Falling Forward"
I Self Devine – Self Destruction (Rhymesayers Entertainment, 2005) Ant produces the tracks "Getcha Money On", "All I Know", "Sex Sex Sex", "Feel My Pain", "I Can't Say Nothing Wrong", "Overthrow" and "Sunshine".

References

External links 

American hip hop record producers
Rhymesayers Entertainment artists
1970 births
Living people
Midwest hip hop musicians
Musicians from Minneapolis
Rhymesayers Entertainment